The Fourth constituency for French residents overseas (quatrième circonscription des Français établis hors de France) is one of eleven constituencies each electing one representative of French citizens overseas to the French National Assembly.

Area
In terms of area, it is the second smallest of the eleven constituencies (after the Sixth), and covers the three Benelux countries: Belgium, the Netherlands and Luxembourg. In contrast, it is the second most populous (after the First) : As of New Year's Day 2011, it contained 150,965 registered French voters. The bulk of these, 101,236, were living in Belgium - the country with the fifth greatest number of registered French residents in the world.

This constituency elected its first ever representative at the 2012 French legislative election.

Deputies

Election results

2022

 
 
 
 
|-
| colspan="8" bgcolor="#E9E9E9"|
|-

2017

2012

Candidates
The list of candidates was officially finalised on 14 May. There were sixteen candidates:

The Union for a Popular Movement initially chose Pascale Andréani, former permanent representative of France to NATO, as its candidate. When Andréani became France's permanent representative to the OECD, the party named Marie-Anne Montchamp, the then-Secretary of State on Solidarity, as candidate in her place. Jeremy Michel was her deputy (suppléant).

The Socialist Party chose Philip Cordery, a resident of Brussels. His deputy (suppléante) was Hélène Le Moing, a resident of The Hague.

Europe Écologie–The Greens chose Perrine Ledan, with Édouard Gaudot as her deputy (suppléant). Ledan, a journalist, is a resident of Brussels.

The Left Front, which included the French Communist Party, chose Charlotte Balavoine, with Patrick Cavaglieri as her deputy (suppléant). Balavoine was a member of the Communist Party.

The Democratic Movement chose Tanguy Le Breton, with Raphael Lederer as his deputy.

The National Front chose Sophie Duval. Martine Masse was her deputy.

The Radical Party of the Left chose Nadia Bourahla, with Philippe Loopuyt as her deputy.

The Christian Democratic Party (an associate party of the UMP) chose Stéphane Buffetaut, with Isabelle Soibinet as his deputy. Buffetaut was also endorsed by the National Centre of Independents and Peasants.

The Pirate Party chose Pablo Martin, with Alix Guillard as his deputy.

Solidarity and Progress, the French branch of the LaRouche movement, was represented by Guillaume Dubost, a 32-year-old electrical engineer and long-term resident of Brussels. He was a presiding member of Agora Erasmus, the Benelux branch of the LaRouche movement. Romain Drouillon was his deputy.

Dominique Paillé, a former spokesman for the Union for a Popular Movement, sought to be the candidate for that party. When he was not chosen, he stated that he would "definitely" be a candidate all the same, standing against Andréani if she did not desist. He eventually became the candidate of the centre-right Radical Party  and the centrist Republican, Ecologist and Social Alliance. A resident of Brussels, he was a lawyer in Paris. His deputy (suppléante) was Anne Monseu Ducarme.

Virginie Taittinger stood as an independent right-wing candidate. Describing herself as close to the UMP, she presented herself as the "candidate of (Nicolas Sarkozy's) presidential majority", although she ran against the UMP-endorsed candidate. A resident of Brussels, she described herself officially as the candidate of the Union of the Centre and the Right of the French in Benelux. Gaël du Bouëtiez was her deputy.

Georges-Francis Seingry, a resident of Brussels who described himself as non-partisan, stood for the Gathering of French Residents Overseas (Rassemblement des Français de l'étranger), a political movement related to the Union for a Popular Movement. Éric Krebs was his deputy.

Ruben Mohedano-Brèthes had been a French expatriate in Belgium since 1996. He was an official of the European Union (in charge of information and communication since 1996: Eurobarometer opinion polls, audio-visual strategy and youth information) and a trade-unionist. He presented himself as an "independent centrist humanist" candidate, under the Force of Freedom banner. He was endorsed by the Centrist Alliance.  He was also endorsed by the Liberal Democratic Party.

There were two independent candidates: Elisabeth Valenti (with Jean-Marie Soja as her deputy); and Elisabeth Chevalier (with Jeannine Porte as her deputy).

Results
As in other constituencies, turnout in the first round was low: 24.4% in Belgium, 24.4% also in Luxembourg, and 22.1% in the Netherlands. Socialist candidate Philip Cordery finished first in all three countries. He went on to win the second round by a fairly large margin.

References

4